Nexus Celebration Mall is a shopping mall in Udaipur two km from Fateh Sagar Lake. The mall is built on the historical theme and houses many utility services.  and opened its first outlet in December 2010 before the official opening on 2 July 2011. The mall is made with the facade of stone along with 23 water bodies cascading fountains inside the mall. Blackstone group has accquired the mall and now it comes in their India NEXUS MALLS portfolio which has 17 malls in India now. The mall is now named as Nexus Celebration Mall.

References 
Nexus Malls to expand portfolio via Blackstone’s acquisitions | Mint (livemint.com)

Buildings and structures in Udaipur
Shopping malls in Rajasthan
Shopping malls established in 2010
2010 establishments in Rajasthan